Harold Bloom (July 11, 1930 – October 14, 2019) was an American literary critic and the Sterling Professor of Humanities at Yale University. In 2017, Bloom was called "probably the most famous literary critic in the English-speaking world." After publishing his first book in 1959, Bloom wrote more than 50 books, including over 40 books of literary criticism, several books discussing religion, and a novel. He edited hundreds of anthologies concerning numerous literary and philosophical figures for the Chelsea House publishing firm. Bloom's books have been translated into more than 40 languages. Bloom was elected to the American Philosophical Society in 1995.

Bloom was a defender of the traditional Western canon at a time when literary departments were focusing on what he derided as the "school of resentment" (multiculturalists, feminists, Marxists, and others). He was educated at Yale University, the University of Cambridge, and Cornell University.

Early life
Bloom was born in New York City on July 11, 1930, the son of Paula (née Lev) and William Bloom. He lived in the Bronx at 1410 Grand Concourse. He was raised as an Orthodox Jew in a Yiddish-speaking household, where he learned literary Hebrew; he learned English at the age of six. Bloom's father, a garment worker, was born in Odessa and his Lithuanian Jewish mother, a homemaker, near Brest Litovsk in what is today Belarus. Harold had three older sisters and an older brother; he was the last living sibling.

As a boy, Bloom read Hart Crane's Collected Poems, a collection that inspired his lifelong fascination with poetry. Bloom went to the Bronx High School of Science, where his grades were poor but his standardized-test scores were high). In 1951 he received a B.A. degree in classics from Cornell, where he was a student of English literary critic M. H. Abrams, and in 1955 a PhD from Yale. In 1954–55 Bloom was a Fulbright Scholar at Pembroke College, Cambridge.

Bloom was a standout student at Yale, where he clashed with the faculty of New Critics, including William K. Wimsatt. Several years later Bloom dedicated his book The Anxiety of Influence to Wimsatt.

Teaching career
Bloom was a member of the Yale English Department from 1955 to 2019, teaching his final class four days before his death. He received a MacArthur Fellowship in 1985. From 1988 to 2004, Bloom was Berg Professor of English at New York University while maintaining his position at Yale. In 2010, he became a founding patron of Ralston College, a new institution in Savannah, Georgia, that focuses on primary texts. Fond of endearments, Bloom addressed both male and female students and friends as "my dear".

Personal life and death
Bloom married Jeanne Gould in 1958. They had two children. In a 2005 interview, Jeanne said that she and Harold were both atheists, which he denied: "No, no, I'm not an atheist. It's no fun being an atheist."

Bloom was the subject of a 1990 article in GQ titled "Bloom in Love", which accused him of having affairs with female graduate students. He called the article a "disgusting piece of character assassination." Bloom's friend and colleague the biographer R. W. B. Lewis said in 1994 that Bloom's "wandering, I gather is a thing of the past. I hate to say it, but he rather bragged about it, so that wasn't very secret for a number of years." In a 2004 article for New York magazine, Naomi Wolf accused Bloom of placing his hand on her inner thigh while she was an undergraduate student at Yale University in 1983. Bloom "vigorously denied" the allegation.

Bloom never retired from teaching, swearing that he would need to be removed from the classroom "in a great big body bag." He had open heart surgery in 2002 and broke his back after experiencing a fall in 2008. He died at a hospital in New Haven, Connecticut, on October 14, 2019. He was 89 years old.

Writing career

Defense of Romanticism
Bloom began his career with a sequence of highly regarded monographs on Percy Bysshe Shelley (Shelley's Myth-making, Yale University Press, originally Bloom's doctoral dissertation), William Blake (Blake's Apocalypse, Doubleday), W. B. Yeats (Yeats, Oxford University Press), and Wallace Stevens (Wallace Stevens: The Poems of Our Climate, Cornell University Press). In these, he defended the High Romantics against neo-Christian critics influenced by such writers as T. S. Eliot, who became a recurring intellectual foil. Bloom had a contentious approach: his first book, Shelley's Myth-making, charged many contemporary critics with sheer carelessness in their reading of the poet.

Influence theory

After a personal crisis during the late 1960s, Bloom became deeply interested in Ralph Waldo Emerson, Sigmund Freud, and the ancient mystic traditions of Gnosticism, Kabbalah, and Hermeticism. In a 2003 interview with Bloom, Michael Pakenham, the book editor for The Baltimore Sun, noted that Bloom had long called himself a "Jewish Gnostic". Bloom responded: "I am using 'Gnostic' in a very broad way. I am nothing if not Jewish... I really am a product of Yiddish culture. But I can't understand a Yahweh, or a God, who could be all-powerful and all-knowing and would allow the Nazi death camps and schizophrenia." Influenced by his reading, he began a series of books that focused on the way in which poets struggle to create their individual poetic visions without being overcome by the influence of the poets who inspired them to write.

The first of these books, Yeats, challenged the conventional critical view of William Butler Yeats's poetic career. In the introduction to this volume, Bloom set out the basic principles of his new approach to criticism: "Poetic influence, as I conceive it, is a variety of melancholy or the anxiety-principle." New poets become inspired to write because they have read and admired previous poets, but this admiration turns into resentment when the new poets discover that the poets they idolized have already said everything they wish to say. The poets become disappointed because they "cannot be Adam early in the morning. There have been too many Adams, and they have named everything."

In order to evade this psychological obstacle, according to Bloom, poets must be convinced that earlier poets have gone wrong somewhere and failed in their vision, thus leaving open the possibility that they have something to add to the tradition. Poets' love for their heroes turns into antagonism toward them: "Initial love for the precursor's poetry is transformed rapidly enough into revisionary strife, without which individuation is not possible." The book that followed Yeats, The Anxiety of Influence, which Bloom started writing in 1967, drew upon the example of Walter Jackson Bate's The Burden of the Past and The English Poet and recast in systematic psychoanalytic form Bate's historicized account of the despair 17th- and 18th-century poets felt about their inability to equal their predecessors. Bloom attempted to trace the psychological process by which poets broke free from their precursors to achieve their own poetic visions. He drew a sharp distinction between "strong poets", who perform "strong misreadings" of their precursors, and "weak poets", who merely repeat their precursors' ideas as though following a kind of doctrine. He described this process in terms of a sequence of "revisionary ratios", through which strong poets pass in the course of their careers.

Addenda and developments of his theory

A Map of Misreading picks up where The Anxiety of Influence left off, making several adjustments to Bloom's system of revisionary ratios. Kabbalah and Criticism attempts to invoke the esoteric interpretive system of the Lurianic Kabbalah, as explicated by scholar Gershom Scholem, as an alternate system of mapping the path of poetic influence. Figures of Capable Imagination collected odd pieces Bloom had written in the process of composing his "influence" books.

Bloom continued to write about influence theory throughout the 1970s and '80s, and penned little thereafter that did not invoke his ideas about influence.

Novel experiment
Bloom's fascination with David Lindsay's fantasy novel A Voyage to Arcturus led him to take a brief break from criticism to compose a sequel to it. This novel, The Flight to Lucifer, was Bloom's only work of fiction.

Religious criticism
Bloom then entered a phase of what he called "religious criticism", beginning with Ruin the Sacred Truths: Poetry and Belief from the Bible to the Present (1989). In The Book of J (1990), he and David Rosenberg (who translated the Biblical texts) portrayed one of the posited ancient documents that formed the basis of the first five books of the Bible (see documentary hypothesis) as the work of a great literary artist who had no intention of composing a dogmatically religious work (see Jahwist). They envisaged this anonymous writer as a woman attached to the court of the successors of the Israelite kings David and Solomon—a piece of speculation that drew much attention. Later, Bloom said that the speculations did not go far enough, and perhaps he should have identified J with the Biblical Bathsheba. In Jesus and Yahweh: The Names Divine (2004), he revisits some of the territory covered in The Book of J in discussing the significance of Yahweh and Jesus of Nazareth as literary characters, while casting a critical eye on historical approaches and asserting the fundamental incompatibility of Christianity and Judaism.

In The American Religion (1992), Bloom surveyed the major varieties of Protestant and post-Protestant religious faiths that originated in the United States and argued that, in terms of their psychological hold on their adherents, most had more in common with gnosticism than with historical Christianity. The exception was the Jehovah's Witnesses, whom Bloom regards as non-Gnostic. He elsewhere predicted that the Mormon and Pentecostal strains of American Christianity would overtake mainstream Protestant divisions in popularity in the next few decades. In Omens of Millennium (1996), Bloom identifies these American religious elements as on the periphery of an old – and not inherently Christian – gnostic, religious tradition that invokes a complex of ideas and experiences concerning angelology, interpretation of dreams as prophecy, near-death experiences, and millennialism.

In his essay in The Gospel of Thomas, Bloom writes that none of Thomas's Aramaic sayings have survived in the original language. Marvin Meyer generally agreed and further confirmed that the earlier versions of that text were likely written in either Aramaic or Greek. Meyer ends his introduction with an endorsement of much of Bloom's essay. Bloom notes the otherworldliness of the Jesus in Thomas's sayings by making reference to "the paradox also of the American Jesus."

The Western Canon
The Western Canon (1994), a survey of the major literary works of Europe and the Americas since the 14th century, focuses on 26 works Bloom considers sublime and representative of their nations and of the Western canon. Besides analyses of the canon's various representative works, Bloom's major concern in the volume was to reclaim literature from what he called the "School of Resentment", the mostly academic critics who espoused a social purpose in their work. Bloom asserted that the goals of reading must be solitary aesthetic pleasure and self-insight rather than the goal of improving one's society held by "forces of resentment". He cast the latter as absurd, writing: "The idea that you benefit the insulted and injured by reading someone of their own origins rather than reading Shakespeare is one of the oddest illusions ever promoted by or in our schools." His position was that politics had no place in literary criticism: that a feminist or Marxist reading of Hamlet would tell us something about feminism and Marxism but probably nothing about Hamlet.

In addition to considering how much influence a writer had had on later writers, Bloom proposed the concept of "canonical strangeness" (cf. uncanny) as a benchmark of a literary work's merit. The Western Canon also included a list—which aroused more widespread interest than anything else in the volume—of the Western works from antiquity to the present that Bloom considered either permanent members of the canon of literary classics, or (among more recent works) candidates for that status. Bloom said that he made the list off the top of his head at his editor's request, and that he did not stand by it.

Work on Shakespeare
{{external media| float = right| video1 = [https://www.c-span.org/video/?116383-1/shakespeare-invention-human Presentation by Bloom on Shakespeare: The Invention of the Human, December 10, 1998], C-SPAN}} 

Bloom had a deep appreciation for William Shakespeare, considering him the supreme center of the Western canon. The first edition of The Anxiety of Influence almost completely avoided Shakespeare, whom Bloom then considered barely touched by the psychological drama of anxiety. The second edition, published in 1997, added a long preface that mostly expounded Shakespeare's debt to Ovid and Chaucer, and his agon with Christopher Marlowe, who set the stage for him by breaking free of ecclesiastical and moralizing overtones.

In his later survey, Shakespeare: The Invention of the Human (1998), Bloom provided an analysis of each of Shakespeare's 38 plays, "twenty-four of which are masterpieces." Written as a companion to the general reader and theater-goer, Bloom declared that bardolatry "ought to be even more a secular religion than it already is." He also contended in the work that Shakespeare "invented" humanity, in that he prescribed the now-common practice of "overhearing" ourselves, which drives our changes. The two paragons of his theory were Sir John Falstaff of Henry IV and Hamlet, whom Bloom saw as representing self-satisfaction and self-loathing, respectively. These two characters, Iago, and Cleopatra Bloom believed (citing A. C. Bradley) are "the four Shakespearean characters most inexhaustible to meditation."

Throughout Shakespeare, characters from disparate plays are imagined alongside and interacting with each other. Contemporary academics and critics decried this as harking back to the out-of-fashion character criticism of Bradley (and others), who are explicitly praised in the book. As in The Western Canon, Bloom criticizes what he calls the "School of Resentment" for its failure to live up to the challenge of Shakespeare's universality and for balkanizing the study of literature through multicultural and historicist departments. Asserting Shakespeare's singular popularity throughout the world, Bloom proclaims him the only truly multicultural author. Repudiating the "social energies" to which historicists ascribed Shakespeare's authorship, Bloom pronounced his modern academic foes – and all of society – to be but "a parody of Shakespearean energies".

2000s and 2010s
 
Bloom consolidated his work on the Western canon with the publication of How to Read and Why (2000) and Genius: A Mosaic of One Hundred Exemplary Creative Minds (2003). Hamlet: Poem Unlimited (also 2003) is an amendment to Shakespeare: Invention of the Human written after Bloom decided the chapter on Hamlet in the earlier book had been too focused on the textual question of the Ur-Hamlet to cover his most central thoughts on the play itself. Some elements of religious criticism were combined with his secular criticism in Where Shall Wisdom Be Found (2004), and a more complete return to religious criticism was marked by the publication of Jesus and Yahweh: The Names Divine (2005). Throughout the decade he also compiled, edited and introduced several major anthologies of poetry.

Bloom took part in Paul Festa's 2006 documentary Apparition of the Eternal Church. It centers on people's reactions to hearing for the first time Olivier Messiaen's organ piece Apparition de l'église éternelle.

Bloom began a book under the working title Living Labyrinth, centering on Shakespeare and Walt Whitman, which was published as The Anatomy of Influence: Literature as a Way of Life (2011).

In July 2011, after the publication of The Anatomy of Influence and after finishing work on The Shadow of a Great Rock, Bloom was working on three further projects:
 Achievement in the Evening Land from Emerson to Faulkner, a history of American literature following the canonical model, which ultimately developed into his book The Daemon Knows: Literary Greatness and the American Sublime (2015).
 The Hum of Thoughts Evaded in the Mind: A Literary Memoir, which ultimately developed into his book Possessed by Memory: The Inward Light of Criticism (2019), the last book Bloom published during his lifetime.
 a play with the working title Walt Whitman: A Musical Pageant. By November 2011, Bloom had changed the title to To You Whoever You Are: A Pageant Celebrating Walt Whitman. This work is unpublished and it is unknown how much of it was finished.

Influence

In 1986, Bloom credited Northrop Frye as his nearest precursor. He told Imre Salusinszky in 1986: "In terms of my own theorizations ... the precursor proper has to be Northrop Frye. I purchased and read Fearful Symmetry a week or two after it had come out and reached the bookstore in Ithaca, New York. It ravished my heart away. I have tried to find an alternative father in Mr. Kenneth Burke, who is a charming fellow and a very powerful critic, but I don't come from Burke, I come out of Frye."

But in Anatomy of Influence (2011), Bloom wrote, "I no longer have the patience to read anything by Frye" and nominated Angus Fletcher among his living contemporaries as his "critical guide and conscience". Elsewhere that year, he recommended Fletcher's Colors of the Mind and M. H. Abrams's The Mirror and the Lamp. In this late phase, Bloom also emphasized the tradition of earlier critics such as William Hazlitt, Ralph Waldo Emerson, Walter Pater, A. C. Bradley, and Samuel Johnson, describing Johnson in The Western Canon as "unmatched by any critic in any nation before or after him". In his 2012 foreword to The Fourth Dimension of a Poem (WW Norton, 2012), Bloom indicated the influence Abrams had upon him in his years at Cornell.

Bloom's theory of poetic influence regards the development of Western literature as a process of borrowing and misreading. Writers find their creative inspiration in previous writers and begin by imitating them, but must make their own work different from their precursors'. As a result, Bloom argues, authors of real power must inevitably "misread" their precursors to make room for fresh imaginings.Paul Fry, "Engl 300: Introduction To Theory Of Literature". Lecture 14 – Influence. Open Yale lectures on the influence of Bloom and Eliot.

Observers often identified Bloom with deconstruction, but he never admitted to sharing more than a few ideas with deconstructionists. He told Robert Moynihan in 1983, "What I think I have in common with the school of deconstruction is the mode of negative thinking or negative awareness, in the technical, philosophical sense of the negative, but which comes to me through negative theology ... There is no escape, there is simply the given, and there is nothing that we can do."

Bloom's association with the Western canon provoked a substantial interest in his opinion of the relative importance of contemporary writers. In the late 1980s, Bloom told an interviewer: "Probably the most powerful living Western writer is Samuel Beckett. He's certainly the most authentic."

Of British writers, Bloom said: "Geoffrey Hill is the strongest British poet now active" and "no other contemporary British novelist seems to me to be of Iris Murdoch's eminence". After Murdoch died, Bloom expressed admiration for novelists such as Peter Ackroyd, Will Self, John Banville, and A. S. Byatt.

In Genius: A Mosaic of One Hundred Exemplary Creative Minds (2003), he called the Portuguese writer José Saramago "the most gifted novelist alive in the world today" and "one of the last titans of an expiring literary genre".

Of American novelists, Bloom said in 2003, "there are four living American novelists I know of who are still at work and who deserve our praise". Saying that "they write the Style of our Age" and that "each has composed canonical works", he identified them as Thomas Pynchon, Philip Roth, Cormac McCarthy, and Don DeLillo. He named their respective strongest works as Gravity's Rainbow, The Crying of Lot 49 and Mason & Dixon; American Pastoral and Sabbath's Theater; Blood Meridian; and Underworld. He added to this estimate the work of John Crowley, with special interest in his Aegypt Sequence and novel Little, Big, saying that "only a handful of living writers in English can equal him as a stylist, and most of them are poets ... only Philip Roth consistently writes on Crowley's level". Shortly before his death, Bloom expressed admiration for the works of Joshua Cohen, William Giraldi, and Nell Freudenberger.

In Kabbalah and Criticism (1975), Bloom identified Robert Penn Warren, James Merrill, John Ashbery, and Elizabeth Bishop as the most important living American poets. By the 1990s, he regularly named A. R. Ammons along with Ashbery and Merrill, and he later identified Henri Cole as the crucial American poet of the generation following those three. He expressed great admiration for the Canadian poets Anne Carson, particularly her verse novel Autobiography of Red, and A. F. Moritz, whom Bloom called "a true poet". Bloom also listed Jay Wright as one of only a handful of major living poets and the best living American poet after Ashbery's death.

Bloom's introduction to Modern Critical Interpretations: Thomas Pynchon's Gravity's Rainbow (1986) features his canon of the "twentieth-century American Sublime", the greatest works of American art produced in the 20th century. Playwright Tony Kushner sees Bloom as an important influence on his work.

Reception
Bloom's work has drawn polarized responses, even among established literary scholars. Bloom was called "probably the most celebrated literary critic in the United States" and "America's best-known man of letters". A 1994 New York Times article said that many younger critics see Bloom as an "outdated oddity", whereas a 1998 New York Times article called him "one of the most gifted of contemporary critics".

James Wood wrote: "Vatic, repetitious, imprecisely reverential, though never without a peculiar charm of his own—a kind of campiness, in fact—Bloom as a literary critic in the last few years has been largely unimportant." Bloom responded to questions about Wood in an interview by saying: "There are period pieces in criticism as there are period pieces in the novel and in poetry. The wind blows and they will go away ... There's nothing to the man ... I don't want to talk about him".

In the early 21st century, Bloom often found himself at the center of literary controversy after criticizing popular writers such as Adrienne Rich, Maya Angelou, and David Foster Wallace. In the pages of The Paris Review, he criticized the populist-leaning poetry slam, saying: "It is the death of art." When Doris Lessing received the Nobel Prize in Literature, he bemoaned the "pure political correctness" of the award to an author of "fourth-rate science fiction", while conceding his appreciation of Lessing's earlier work.

MormonVoices, a group associated with Foundation for Apologetic Information & Research, included Bloom on its Top Ten Anti-Mormon Statements of 2011 list for saying, "The current head of the Mormon Church, Thomas S. Monson, known to his followers as 'prophet, seer and revelator,' is indistinguishable from the secular plutocratic oligarchs who exercise power in our supposed democracy." This was despite Bloom's sympathy for Joseph Smith, the founding prophet of Mormonism, whom he called a "religious genius".

Selected bibliography

Books

 Shelley's Mythmaking. New Haven: Yale University Press, 1959.
 The Visionary Company: A Reading of English Romantic Poetry. Garden City, N.Y.: Doubleday, 1961. Revised and enlarged edn. Ithaca: Cornell University Press, 1971.
 Blake's Apocalypse: A Study in Poetic Argument. Anchor Books: New York: Doubleday and Co., 1963.
 The Literary Criticism of John Ruskin.; edited with introduction. New York: DoubleDay, 1965.
 Walter Pater: Marius the Epicurean; edition with introduction. New York: New American Library, 1970.
 Romanticism and Consciousness: Essays in Criticism.; edited with introduction. New York: Norton, 1970.
 Yeats. New York: Oxford University Press, 1970. 
 The Ringers in the Tower: Studies in Romantic Tradition. Chicago: University of Chicago Press, 1971.
 The Anxiety of Influence: A Theory of Poetry. New York: Oxford University Press, 1973; 2nd edn, 1997. 
 The Selected Writings of Walter Pater; edition with introduction and notes. New York: New American Library, 1974.
 A Map of Misreading. New York: Oxford University Press, 1975.
 Kabbalah and Criticism. New York : Seabury Press, 1975. 
 Poetry and Repression: Revisionism from Blake to Stevens. New Haven: Yale University Press, 1976.
 Figures of Capable Imagination. New York: Seabury Press, 1976.
 Wallace Stevens: The Poems of our Climate. Ithaca, N.Y.: Cornell University Press, 1977.
 Deconstruction and Criticism. New York: Seabury Press, 1980.
 The Flight to Lucifer: A Gnostic Fantasy. New York: Vintage Books, 1980. 
 Agon: Towards a Theory of Revisionism. New York: Oxford University Press, 1982.
 The Breaking of the Vessels. Chicago: University of Chicago Press, 1982.
 The Poetics of Influence: New and Selected Criticism. New Haven: Henry R. Schwab, 1988.
 Ruin the Sacred Truths: Poetry and Belief from the Bible to the Present. Cambridge, Mass.: Harvard University Press, 1989.
 The Book of J: Translated from the Hebrew by David Rosenberg; Interpreted by Harold Bloom. New York: Grove Press, 1990 
 The Gospel of Thomas: The Hidden Sayings of Jesus; translation with introduction, critical edition of the Coptic text and notes by Marvin Meyer, with an interpretation by Harold Bloom. San Francisco: HarperSanFrancisco, 1992.
 The American Religion: The Emergence of the Post-Christian Nation; Touchstone Books;  (1992; August 1993)
 The Western Canon: The Books and School of the Ages. New York: Harcourt Brace, 1994.
 Omens of Millennium: The Gnosis of Angels, Dreams, and Resurrection. New York: Riverhead Books, 1996.
 Shakespeare: The Invention of the Human. New York: 1998. 
 How to Read and Why. New York: 2000. 
 Stories and Poems for Extremely Intelligent Children of All Ages. New York: 2001.
 El futur de la imaginació (The Future of the Imagination). Barcelona: Anagrama / Empúries, 2002. 
 Genius: A Mosaic of One Hundred Exemplary Creative Minds. New York: 2003. 
 Hamlet: Poem Unlimited. New York: 2003.
 The Best Poems of the English Language: From Chaucer Through Frost. New York: 2004. 
 Where Shall Wisdom Be Found? New York: 2004. 
 Jesus and Yahweh: The Names Divine. 2005. 
 American Religious Poems: An Anthology By Harold Bloom. 2006. 
 Fallen Angels, illustrated by Mark Podwal. Yale University Press, 2007. 
 Till I End My Song: A Gathering of Last Poems Harper, 2010. 
 The Anatomy of Influence: Literature as a Way of Life. Yale University Press, 2011. 
 The Shadow of a Great Rock: A Literary Appreciation of The King James Bible. Yale University Press, 2011. 
 The Daemon Knows: Literary Greatness and the American Sublime. Spiegel & Grau, 2015. 
 Falstaff: Give Me Life. Scribner, 2017. 
 Cleopatra: I Am Fire and Air. Scribner, 2017. 
 Lear: The Great Image of Authority. Scribner, 2018. 
 Iago: The Strategies of Evil. Scribner, 2018. 
 Macbeth: A Dagger of the Mind. Scribner, 2019. 
 Possessed by Memory: The Inward Light of Criticism. Knopf, 2019. 
 Take Arms Against a Sea of Troubles: The Power of the Reader’s Mind Over a Universe of Death. Yale, 2020. 
 The Bright Book of Life: Novels to Read and Re-read. Knopf, 2020. 

Articles

 "On Extended Wings"; Wallace Stevens' Longer Poems. By Helen Hennessy Vendler, (Review), The New York Times, October 5, 1969.
 "Poets' meeting in the heyday of their youth; A Single Summer With Lord Byron", The New York Times, February 15, 1970.
 "An angel's spirit in a decaying (and active) body", The New York Times, November 22, 1970.
 "The Use of Poetry", The New York Times, November 12, 1975.
 "Northrop Frye exalting the designs of romance; The Secular Scripture", The New York Times, April 18, 1976.
 "On Solitude in America", The New York Times, August 4, 1977.
 "The Critic/Poet", The New York Times, February 5, 1978.
 "A Fusion of Traditions: The Collected Works of Isaac Rosenberg", The New York Times, July 22, 1979.
 "Straight Forth Out of Self", The New York Times, June 22, 1980.
 "The Heavy Burden of the Past; Poets", The New York Times, January 4, 1981.
 "The Pictures of the Poet; The Painting and Drawings of William Blake, by Martin Butlin. Vol. I, Text. Vol. II, Plates" (review), The New York Times, January 3, 1982.
 "A Novelist's Bible; The Story of the Stories, The Chosen People and Its God. By Dan Jacobson" (review), The New York Times, October 17, 1982.
 "Isaac Bashevis Singer's Jeremiad; The Penitent, By Isaac Bashevis Singer" (review), The New York Times, September 25, 1983.
 "Domestic Derangements; A Late Divorce, By A. B. Yehoshua Translated by Hillel Halkin" (review), The New York Times, February 19, 1984.
 "War Within the Walls; In the Freud Archives, By Janet Malcolm" (review), The New York Times, May 27, 1984.
 "His Long Ordeal by Laughter; Zuckerman Bound, A Trilogy and Epilogue. By Philip Roth" (review), The New York Times, May 19, 1985.
 "A Comedy of Worldly Salvation; The Good Apprentice, By Iris Murdoch" (review), The New York Times, January 12, 1986.
 "Freud, the Greatest Modern Writer" (review), The New York Times, March 23, 1986.
 "Passionate Beholder of America in Trouble; Look Homeward, A Life of Thomas Wolfe. By David Herbert Donald" (review), The New York Times, February 8, 1987.
 "The Book of the Father; The Messiah of Stockholm, By Cynthia Ozick" (review), The New York Times, March 22, 1987.
 "Still Haunted by Covenant" (review), The New York Times, January 31, 1988.
 "New Heyday of Gnostic Heresies", The New York Times, April 26, 1992.
 "A Jew Among the Cossacks; The first English translation of Isaac Babel's journal about his service with the Russian cavalry. 1920 Diary, By Isaac Babel" (review), The New York Times, June 4, 1995.
 "Kaddish; By Leon Wieseltier" (review), The New York Times, October 4, 1998.
 "View; On First Looking into Gates's Crichton", The New York Times, June 4, 2000.
 "What Ho, Malvolio!'; The election, as Shakespeare might have seen it", The New York Times, December 6, 2000.
 "Macbush" (play), Vanity Fair, April 2004.
 "The Lost Jewish Culture", The New York Review of Books 54/11 (June 28, 2007) : 44–47 [reviews The Dreams of the Poem: Hebrew Poetry from Muslim and Christian Spain, 950–1492, translated, edited, and with an introduction by Peter Cole
 "The Glories of Yiddish" The New York Review of Books 55/17 (November 6, 2008) [reviews History of the Yiddish Language, by Max Weinreich, edited by Paul Glasser, translated from the Yiddish by Shlomo Noble with the assistance of Joshua A. Fishman]
 "Yahweh Meets R. Crumb", The New York Review of Books, 56/19 (December 3, 2009) [reviews The Book of Genesis, illustrated by R. Crumb]
 "Will This Election Be the Mormon Breakthrough?", The New York Times, November 12, 2011.
 "Richard III: Victim or Monster? Asks Harold Bloom", Newsweek, February 11, 2013.
 Introduction to The Invention of Influence by Peter Cole, The Tablet, January 21, 2014.

Reference Series
 Bloom's Bio Critiques Series, Bloom's Literary Criticism
 Bloom's Modern Critical Interpretations Series, Bloom's Literary Criticism
 Bloom's Major Short Story Writers Series, Bloom's Literary Criticism

See also

References

Further reading

 
 
 
  

 
 
  His famous criticism of the Harry Potter series.
 
 
 
 Burrow, Colin, "The Magic Bloomschtick" (review of Harold Bloom, The American Canon: Literary Genius from Emerson to Pynchon, edited by David Mikics, Library of America, October 2019, 426 pp.), London Review of Books'', vol. 41, no. 22 (21 November 2019), pp. 21–25. "Harold Bloom will be remembered as a great provoker – of thought, of laughter, and of resistance. He didn't permanently reconfigure the literary landscape, but the idiosyncratic path he tracked across it is one few could follow." (Final two sentences of Burrow's review, p. 25.)

External links

  at Yale University
 
 
 In Depth interview with Bloom, May 4, 2003, C-SPAN
 
 
 Harold Bloom at Stanford Presidential Lectures
 

1930 births
2019 deaths
20th-century American educators
20th-century American writers
21st-century American educators
21st-century American writers
Alumni of Pembroke College, Cambridge
American academics of English literature
American literary critics
American people of Belarusian-Jewish descent
American people of Ukrainian-Jewish descent
Cornell University alumni
Critics of postmodernism
Jewish American academics
Jewish scholars
Literary critics of English
MacArthur Fellows
Members of the American Academy of Arts and Letters
New York University faculty
Shakespearean scholars
The Bronx High School of Science alumni
W. B. Yeats scholars
William Blake scholars
Writers from the Bronx
Writers from New Haven, Connecticut
Yale Sterling Professors
Yale Graduate School of Arts and Sciences alumni
Yale University faculty
Yiddish-speaking people
Fulbright alumni